Stampfer is a German language surname. Notable people with the surname include:

 Simon von Stampfer (1792 (1790) – 1864), Austrian mathematician
 Yehoshua Stampfer (1852–1908), one of the founders of Petah Tikva in Israel
 Shaul Stampfer (born 1948), American Jewish historian
 Wolfgang Stamppfer (born 1972), Austrian bobsledder

See also
 3440 Stampfer, main-belt asteroid